Scleria sumatrensis, commonly known as nutrush and Sumatran scleria, is a plant species in the sedge family. It is native to temperate and tropical Asia (in China, India, Malesia, and Sri Lanka), where it is usually found growing in wetlands, and is considered a noxious weed on the island of Borneo. It has been used in traditional medicine against  gonorrhea.

References

sumatrensis
Flora of China
Flora of tropical Asia
Tropical flora
Medicinal plants
Plants described in 1789